Claremont railway station is a Metrorail station on the Southern Line, serving the suburb of Claremont in Cape Town.

The station has three tracks, served by a side platform and an island platform; the station building is at ground level on the western side of the tracks. Adjacent to the station is major bus station of the Golden Arrow Bus Services and a large minibus taxi rank.

Notable places nearby
 Claremont business district, including:
 Cavendish Square
 Stadium on Main
 MontClare Place
 Villagers FC
 Claremont Hospital

Railway stations in Cape Town
Metrorail Western Cape stations